Caffrocrambus sordidella is a moth in the family Crambidae. It was described by Hubert Marion in 1957. It is found in Benin.

References

Crambinae
Moths described in 1957
Moths of Africa